The discography of Scottish music producer Sophie consists of one studio album, one compilation album, one remix album, one extended play, 14 singles, and eight official remixes. Sophie was also known for production and writing work for other artists such as Charli XCX, Madonna, Kim Petras, LIZ, and MØ among others.

Albums

Studio albums

Compilation albums

Remix albums

Extended plays

Singles

As lead artist

As a featured artist

Other appearances

Remixes

Songwriting and production credits

"Reverse N Stop" was released in Simlish as an option for the pop radio station in The Sims 4 Island Living. BC Kingdom has confirmed on Twitter and Instagram that the track will be released in English in the future.
This is a remix featuring Chicago rapper Cupcakke of the 2017 single, which was also co-produced by Sophie. The production is only slightly different.

Music videos 

Other appearances

Mixes

References

External links
 

Discographies of British artists
Pop music discographies
Electronic music discographies